The national emblem of the Mordovian Autonomous Soviet Socialist Republic was adopted in 1937 by the government of the Mordovian Autonomous Soviet Socialist Republic. The emblem is identical to the emblem of the Russian Soviet Federative Socialist Republic.

History

First version 
The First Congress of Soviets of the Mordovian ASSR approved the state emblem of the republic on its resolution of December 27, 1934. According to the text of the decree "On the State Emblem and the State Flag of the Mordovian SSR":

Second version 
On August 30, 1937, at the Extraordinary 2nd Congress of Soviets of the Republic, there was the adoption the new Constitution of the Mordovian ASSR. The coat of arms repeated the emblem of the RSFSR. The difference is only at the inscriptions: "Мордовская АССР. Мордовскяй АССР. Мордовской АССР" and the Mordvin language (Moksha and Erzya) motto: "Сембе масторонь, пролетариятие, пуромода марс!" and "Весе мастортнень пролетарийтне, пурнаводо вейс!". In the Constitution, the arms were described in Article 110:

First revision 
The Extraordinary IX session of the Supreme Council of the 9th Mordovian ASSR Supreme Soviet on May 30, 1978 adopted a new Constitution of the republic. The description of the emblem was amended, with a red star added. The text of the motto in the Mordvin languages was as follows: "Сембе масторонь пролетариятие, пуромода марс!" and "Весе масторонь пролетарийть, вейсэндяводо!"

Gallery

References

Citations

Bibliography

Constitutions

Books 

Mordovian Autonomous Soviet Socialist Republic
Mordovian ASSR
Mordovian ASSR
Mordovian ASSR
Mordovian ASSR
Mordovian ASSR